Lycomedes was the name of a number of mythological figures.

Lycomedes may also refer to:

 Lycomedes of Comana
 Lycomedes of Mantinea
 9694 Lycomedes
 Lycomedes (beetle), a genus of Rhinocerus Beetle in subfamily Dynastinae